The Ashgabat National Museum of History is a history museum in Ashgabat, the capital city of Turkmenistan. It contains over 500,000 exhibits particularly archaeological and ethnographical finds throughout the country including rare works of ancient art, paintings, drawings, sculptures, carpets, rugs, fabrics and clothing; household utensils, musical instruments, weapons, jewelry, medals, historical documents, horn-shaped vessels made of ivory, statuettes of Parthian goddesses and colourful Buddhist vases.

It also contains a significant number of fossils and rare geological finds.

References

Museums in Ashgabat